The Jama'are River, also known as the Bunga River in its upper reaches, starts in the highlands near Jos, Plateau State, Nigeria and flows northeast through Bauchi State and Yobe State before joining the Hadejia River to form the Yobe River. There has recently been controversy over a plan to build the Kafin Zaki Dam on this river, with concerns over the effect on seasonal flooding and the water table.

External links

References

Rivers of Nigeria
Bauchi State
Yobe State